Urospermum picroides is a species of flowering plant in the family Asteraceae known by the common name prickly goldenfleece. It is native to Eurasia and it is known as an introduced species in many other regions, including North and South America, Australia, and southern Africa. It grows as a common weed in disturbed habitat. This annual herb grows up to 30 to 50 centimeters tall. It is coated in long hairs and bristles. The bristly leaves are variously shaped, often divided into many sharp-toothed lobes. The inflorescence bears flower heads on thick peduncles. The head is 1 to 2 centimeters long or more and filled with yellow ray florets. It is enveloped in several pointed phyllaries which are covered in bristly hairs. The fruit is an achene well over a centimeter in length which is tipped with a pappus of bristles.

External links
Jepson Manual Treatment
USDA Plants Profile
Flora of North America
New South Wales Flora
Photo gallery

Cichorieae
Flora of Europe
Flora of Western Asia
Flora of Lebanon